Caerlaverock is a civil parish in Dumfries and Galloway, Scotland.

The parish was historically in Dumfriesshire.  The area includes:
 Caerlaverock National Nature Reserve, a National Nature Reserve in the Solway Firth, south-west Scotland

Etymology 
The name Caerlaverock is of Brittonic origin. The first part of the name is the element cajr meaning "an enclosed, defensible site", (Welsh caer, "fort, city"). The second part of the name may be the personal name Lïμarch (Welsh Llywarch), or a lost stream-name formed from the adjective laβar, "talkative" (Welsh llafar, see Afon Llafar), suffixed with –ǭg, "having the quality of", or the adjectival suffix -īg. The present form has been influenced by the Scots word laverock, "skylark".

External links

Map
Historical Tax Rolls

References 

Geography of Dumfries and Galloway
Dumfriesshire
Civil parishes of Scotland
Parishes in Dumfries and Galloway